The 1994 Miami Hurricanes football team represented the University of Miami during the 1994 NCAA Division I-A football season. It was the Hurricanes' 69th season of football and fourth as a member of the Big East Conference. The Hurricanes were led by sixth-year head coach Dennis Erickson and played their home games at the Orange Bowl. They finished the season 10–2 overall and 7–0 in the Big East to finish as conference champion. They were invited to the Orange Bowl, which served as the Bowl Coalition National Championship Game, where they lost to Nebraska, 24-17.

Schedule

Personnel

Coaching staff

Support staff

Roster

Rankings

Season summary

Georgia Southern

Washington

Washington's win in the Miami Orange Bowl snapped a 58-game home winning streak for the Hurricanes.

vs. Nebraska (Orange Bowl)

Statistics

Passing

Rushing

Receiving

Awards and honors
Warren Sapp, Chuck Bednarik Award
Warren Sapp, Lombardi Award
Warren Sapp, Bronko Nagurski Award
Warren Sapp, First-team All-Big East
Warren Sapp, Consensus First-team All-American (1994)
Warren Sapp, Big East Defensive Player of the Year (1994)

Jack Harding University of Miami MVP Award
Warren Sapp, DT

1995 NFL Draft

Notes 

 Dwayne Johnson went on to presume a wrestling career under the ring name The Rock.

References

Miami
Miami Hurricanes football seasons
Big East Conference football champion seasons
Miami Hurricanes football